The Waalsdorpervlakte is an open place in the dune area "Meijendel" (The Hague, Netherlands), where between 250 and 280 members of the Dutch resistance were killed by the Germans during World War II. After the liberation of the Netherlands, Nazi collaborators were executed at the site. Anton Mussert, the leader of National Socialist Movement in the Netherlands, was executed here on 7 May 1946. 

It is one of the main locations where on 4 May "Remembrance of the Dead", a yearly commemoration of victims of World War II and other victims of war, is held.

References

External links

 Official website of the Waalsdorpervlakte commemoration site

Geography of The Hague
World War II memorials in the Netherlands
Execution sites